The qualification for the 1964 AFC Asian Cup consisted of several teams separated in four groups. The winner of each group would join hosts Israel in the final tournament.

Zones

 * Withdrew
 ** Moved to Central group 2

Central zone 
All matches held in South Vietnam.

Eastern zone 
All the others withdrew, so  qualified automatically.

Western zone 
All the others withdrew, so  qualified automatically.

Qualified teams

References 

 Details at RSSSF

AFC Asian Cup qualification
Q
Qual
1963 in Vietnam
1963